Rubus alumnus is a North American species of highbush blackberry in section Alleghenienses of the genus Rubus, a member of the rose family. It is native to eastern and central Canada (Ontario, Québec, Nova Scotia) and the eastern and central United States (from Maine south to North Carolina and west as far as Oklahoma, Kansas, and Minnesota).

References

External links
 photo of herbarium specimen at Missouri Botanical Garden, collected in Missouri in 1997
 
 
 

alumnus
Plants described in 1923
Flora of Canada
Flora of the United States